The 1972 Scottish League Cup final was played on 9 December 1972 and was the final of the 27th Scottish League Cup competition. It was contested by Hibernian and Celtic. Hibs won the match 2–1, thanks to goals by Jimmy O'Rourke and Pat Stanton. This meant that Hibs won their first major national cup competition since the 1902 Scottish Cup, and it was their first cup win at Hampden Park.

Match details

See also
League Cup finals played between the same clubs:
 1969 Scottish League Cup final (April)
 1974 Scottish League Cup final
 2021 Scottish League Cup final (December)

References

External links
 Soccerbase
 TheCelticWiki

1972
League Cup Final
Scottish League Cup Final 1972
Scottish League Cup Final 1972
1970s in Glasgow
Scottish League Cup Final